Adrian Jarrell Clayborn (born July 6, 1988) is a former American football defensive end. He played college football for the University of Iowa, and earned consensus All-American honors. He was drafted by the Tampa Bay Buccaneers in the first round of the 2011 NFL Draft. Clayborn also played for the Atlanta Falcons, the Cleveland Browns and the New England Patriots. With the Patriots, he won Super Bowl LIII over the Los Angeles Rams.

Personal life
Clayborn was born in St. Louis, Missouri. At birth, he suffered from a condition known as Erb's Palsy, something that is caused during birth by an injury to the nerves surrounding a child's shoulder. Because his head and neck were pulled to the side as his shoulders passed through the birth canal, he suffered nerve damage resulting in the loss of some movement and weakness in his right arm. Clayborn underwent physical therapy throughout his young life and eventually overcame the limitations caused by the disability.

When Adrian was 10, his older brother Anthony was shot and killed in northern St. Louis. He was survived by his seven children: Asia, Aaliyah, Andrea, Anthony Junior, Demonte, Leaunte, and Keith.

Adrian and his wife Shannon volunteer at the Hesed House homeless shelter in Aurora, IL.

High school career
Clayborn attended high school at Webster Groves High School, where he was a four-year letterman in football and basketball.

Awards and honors
2005 Missouri Player of the Year
2005 Missouri All-State
2004 Missouri All-State

College career
Clayborn attended the University of Iowa, and played for the Iowa Hawkeyes football team from 2006 to 2010. He took a redshirt year in 2006, his first season at Iowa. In 2007, Clayborn became a second-string defensive lineman and saw action in several games on special teams. In 2008, Clayborn saw substantial playing time, recording 8 tackles for loss and 50 total tackles. In 2009, Clayborn had a breakout year with 20 tackles for loss. In a dominant effort against Georgia Tech, Clayborn was named Orange Bowl MVP.

Heading into the 2010 season, Clayborn was listed on the preseason watch list for several awards. ESPN, Playboy Magazine, Sporting News, College Football Insiders, Lindy's, and Phil Steele all selected Clayborn for their pre-season first-team All-American lists.

On October 2, 2010, Clayborn had his first break-out game of 2010. He had three tackles for loss against Penn State despite being triple-teamed for parts of the game. His play earned him Big Ten Defensive Player of the Week. On November 10, 2010, Clayborn was named one of four finalists for the Lombardi Award.

While preparing for the 2010 Insight Bowl, Iowa head coach Kirk Ferentz announced that Clayborn was one of three Hawkeyes invited to attend the Senior Bowl, college football's pre-draft event featuring seniors with NFL prospects.

Awards and honors

2010
Consensus First-team All-American by NCAA, AFCA and Walter Camp.
First-team All-Big Ten (Coaches, Media)
American Football Coaches Association First-team All-American
Ted Hendricks Award Finalist
Rotary Lombardi Award Finalist
Rotary Lombardi Award Pre-season Watch List
Bednarik Award Semi-finalist
Bednarik Award Pre-season Watch List
Walter Camp Player of the Year Watch List
Bronko Nagurski Trophy Watch List 
Playboy Magazine Pre-season All-America Team selection
College Football Performance Award Honorable Mention
Big Ten Defensive Player of the Week – October 4, 2010

2009
Big Ten Player of the Week – October 25, 2009
Big Ten Defensive Player of The Week
2010 Orange Bowl MVP

Professional career

Tampa Bay Buccaneers
Clayborn was drafted in the first round (20th overall) of the 2011 NFL Draft by the Tampa Bay Buccaneers. Clayborn recorded his first sack in week 3 of the 2011 season against the Atlanta Falcons. His sack on Matt Ryan also caused a fumble recovered by teammate Michael Bennett. In 2012, Clayborn was placed on injured reserve after injuring his knee. Before the 2014 season, it was announced by new GM Jason Licht that the Buccaneers would not be picking up the 5th year option on his rookie contract. He was also moved to the left side since the team signed Michael Johnson for the right side. Though he started out strong in the year, he suffered yet another season-ending injury placing him on IR and his future in Tampa in doubt since he would be an unrestricted free agent in 2015.

Atlanta Falcons

On March 12, 2015, Clayborn signed with the Atlanta Falcons. On March 9, 2016, he re-signed with the Falcons on a two-year deal worth $9 million. He played in 13 games with seven starts recording 22 tackles and 4.5 sacks. In the divisional round of the playoffs, Clayborn suffered a torn bicep and was placed on injured reserve on January 17, 2017, causing him to miss the rest of the playoffs. Without Clayborn, the Falcons reached Super Bowl LI where they lost 34–28 in overtime to the New England Patriots.

On November 12, 2017, in Week 10 against the Dallas Cowboys, Clayborn recorded a franchise-record six sacks, one away from tying Derrick Thomas' record of seven, as the Falcons won the game 27–7. He was named the NFC Defensive Player of the Week days later.

New England Patriots
On March 17, 2018, Clayborn signed a two-year $10 million contract with the New England Patriots. In Clayborn's first season in New England, Clayborn recorded 11 tackles and 2.5 sacks. With Clayborn, the Patriots went on to win Super Bowl LIII 13–3 against the Los Angeles Rams to give Clayborn his first championship.

On March 15, 2019, Clayborn was released by the Patriots.

Atlanta Falcons (second stint) 
On April 9, 2019, Clayborn signed a one-year $4 million contract with the Atlanta Falcons. In Week 2 against the Philadelphia Eagles, Clayborn recorded his first sack of the season in the 24–20 win. In Week 10 against the New Orleans Saints, Clayborn had one sack in the 26–9 win. In Week 11 against the Carolina Panthers, Clayborn had two sacks in the 29–3 win. Clayborn played in 15 games with one start, recording 18 tackles, four sacks and two forced fumbles.

Cleveland Browns 
On April 9, 2020, Clayborn signed a two-year, $6 million contract with the Cleveland Browns. He finished the season with 3.5 sacks and a forced fumble.

Clayborn was released by the Browns on March 9, 2021.

NFL career statistics

References

External links
Cleveland Browns bio
Atlanta Falcons bio
Iowa Hawkeyes bio
Official website
NFL Combine profile
ESPN stats

1988 births
Living people
All-American college football players
American football defensive ends
Atlanta Falcons players
Cleveland Browns players
Iowa Hawkeyes football players
New England Patriots players
Players of American football from Missouri
People from Webster Groves, Missouri
Sportspeople from St. Louis County, Missouri
Tampa Bay Buccaneers players
Webster Groves High School alumni
Ed Block Courage Award recipients